Ronn or Rönn or Rønn may refer to:

Companies
 Ronn Motor Company, a car manufacturer based in Austin, Texas
 Ronn Records, a subsidiary of Jewel Records (Shreveport record label)

Surname
 Christian Rønn (born 1969), Danish musician and composer
 Jyri Rönn (born 1971), Finnish ice hockey referee
 Solveig Rönn-Christiansson (1902–1982), Swedish politician

Given name
 Ronn Carroll (active from 1980), American actor
 Ronn Lucas (born 1954), American ventriloquist and stand-up comedian
 Ronn Matlock (1947–2020), American singer and songwriter
 Ronn McFarlane (born 1953), American lutenist and composer
 Ronn McMahon (active 1990–1994), Canadian basketball player
 Ronn Metcalfe (1930–1969), Canadian big band leader 
 Ronn Moss (born 1952), American actor, musician and singer/songwriter
 Ronn Owens (born 1945), American talk radio host
 Ronn Reynolds (born 1958), American MLB catcher
 Ronn Sutton (born 1952), Canadian illustrator and comic book artist
 Ronn Tomassoni (born 1958), American ice hockey player and coach
 Ronn Torossian (born 1974), American public relations executive

See also
 Ron (disambiguation)